Rue Pierre Schoonejans is street in Brussels in the municipality of Auderghem that goes from the Chaussée de Wavre to Avenue Joseph Cauldron. Its length is 220 meters (715 feet).

History

This road long bore the name of the mill located there: la Papiermolenstraet ("Paper Mill Street").

The old Paper Mill street appears on the map of Ferraris (1771). The street was surrounded by woods up to the ponds located below the street, which are now dried up. People took this route to reach the paper mill quickly.

This road is numbered 24 in the l’Atlas des Communications Vicinales (1843).

On September 14, 1934, the college decided to name this road after the painter Adolphe Keller, wanting to avoid any confusion with the rue du Vieux Moulin (Old Mill Road). However, residents brought a petition to change the name to Pierre Schoonejans who lived there and was very popular, after 25 years of activity in local politics. The college accepted the people's recommendation. Pierre Schoonejans was never more than a municipal councilor. He is the only auderghemois politician to give his name to a street without having served a term as mayor or alderman.

Rue Pierre Schoonejans stretched from avenue des Frères Goemaere (near Chaussée de Wavre) to Boulevard du Souverain: rue du Moulin à Papier and Lemaire were included.

On 17 July 1936, the current rue du Moulin à Papier was revived. Since then, rue Schoonejans has kept its final length.

References

Streets in Brussels
Auderghem